"What the Heart Wants" is a song written by Michael Dulaney, and recorded by American country music singer Collin Raye.  It was released in June 1997 as the first single from his compilation album The Best of Collin Raye: Direct Hits.  The song peaked at #2 on the U.S. Billboard country music charts and #2 on the Canadian RPM Country Tracks.

Chart performance
The song debuted at number 69 on the Billboard Hot Country Singles & Tracks chart dated June 7, 1997.

Year-end charts

References

1997 singles
Collin Raye songs
Song recordings produced by Paul Worley
Epic Records singles
Songs written by Michael Dulaney
1997 songs